Kanpur Graduates constituency is one of 100 Legislative Council seats in Uttar Pradesh. This constituency covers Kanpur Nagar, Kanpur Dehat and Unnao district.

Member of Legislative Council

 *By Election in January 2015.

Election results

See also
 Kanpur (Teachers constituency)
 Kanpur Cantonment (Assembly constituency)
 Kanpur (Lok Sabha constituency)

References

Uttar Pradesh Legislative Council
Graduates constituencies in India